The National Convergence Front (FCN–Nación) is a right-wing political party in Guatemala.

History
The party was established on 7 January 2008. It was initiated by a group of retired army officers, including veterans of Guatemalan Civil War, affiliated with the Military Veterans Association of Guatemala AVEMILGUA. FCN did not nominate a presidential candidate in the 2011 general elections, but contested the Congressional elections, receiving 0.5% of the vote and failing to win a seat. In March 2013, the party chose the popular comic TV actor Jimmy Morales as its General Secretary.

Morales was the party's presidential candidate in the 2015 elections, which he won after receiving the largest vote share in the first round (24%) and then beating former first lady Sandra Torres in the run-off with 67% of the vote. In the Congressional elections the FCN received the fifth-highest vote share (9%), winning 11 of the 158 seats.

FCN's head of the national list was Édgar Justino Ovalle Maldonado who is considered to be Jimmy Morales' "right-hand man". He commanded counter-insurgency operations in the Ixil Community in the early 1980s during which several massacres against the Ixil Mayas took place. The violence against the Ixil was acknowledged as a genocide by the Supreme Court of Guatemala, but is denied by Jimmy Morales.

Election results

President

Congress

References

External links
 

2008 establishments in Guatemala
Conservative parties in Guatemala
Nationalist parties in North America
Political parties established in 2008
Protestantism in Guatemala
Protestant political parties